Brojokishore Chakraborty  (1913 – 25 October 1934) was an Indian revolutionary and member of the Bengal Volunteers who carried out assassinations against British colonial officials in an attempt to secure Indian independence. He was hanged on 25 October 1934 along with Ramkrishna Roy for the charge of assassination of Magistrate Burge.

Family 
Brojokishore Chakraborty was born in Ballavpur (Paschim Medinipur) in 1913. His father's name was Upendranath Chakraborty. He joined Bengal Volunteers, a revolutionary organisation of British India.

Revolutionary activities 
After the murder of Magistrate Paddy and Robert Douglas no British officer was ready to take the charge of Midnapore District. Mr. Bernard E J Burge, a ruthless District Magistrate was posted in Midnapore district. The members of the Bengal volunteers i.e. Ramkrishna Roy, Brajakishore Chakraborty,Prabhanshu Sekhar Pal, Kamakhya Charan Ghosh, Sonatan Roy, Nanda Dulal Singh, Sukumar Sen Gupta, Bijoy Krishna Ghose, Purnananda Sanyal, Manindra Nath Choudhury, Saroj Ranjan Das Kanungo, Santi Gopal Sen, Sailesh Chandra Ghose, Anath Bondhu Panja and Mrigendra Dutta etc. decided to assassinate him .  Ramkrishna Roy, Brajakishore Chakraborty, Nirmal Jibon Ghosh  and Mrigendra Dutta planned to shoot him dead while Burge was playing a football match ( Bradley-Birt football tournament) named by Francis Bradley Bradley-Birt at the police grounds of Midnapore.   Burge, during the half time of the football match in Police parade ground was killed on 2 September 1933 by them. Anathbandhu was killed instantly by the body guard of the DM and Mrigen Dutta died in the hospital on the next day. Anath Bondhu Panja and Mrigendra Dutta was acquitted on murder charge of the district magistrate of Midnapore,

Death 
He was hanged on 25 October 1934 along with Ramkrishna Roy for the charge of assassination of Magistrate Burge.

References

1913 births
1934 deaths
Executed revolutionaries
Revolutionary movement for Indian independence
Indian nationalism
Indian people convicted of murder
Indian revolutionaries
People from Paschim Medinipur district
Revolutionaries from West Bengal
Indian independence activists from West Bengal